The 1966 Los Angeles Dodgers won the National League championship with a 95–67 record ( games over the San Francisco Giants), but were swept by the Baltimore Orioles in the World Series.

Regular season
Sandy Koufax became the first pitcher to win three Cy Young Awards in a career.

Season recap
The defending World Series champion Dodgers relied upon the same model that brought them the championship in 1965; great pitching, tight defense, and speed. However, ace pitchers Sandy Koufax and Don Drysdale held out nearly all of spring training in a celebrated contract dispute, finally signing just before the start of the regular season.  The hold out did not seem to affect Koufax, who went 27–9 with a 1.73 E.R.A. However, Drysdale had a sub par season going 13–16 with a 3.42 E.R.A. More than making up for that, Claude Osteen had his best season to date, winning 17 games with a 2.85 E.R.A., and rookie Don Sutton replaced aging Johnny Podres in the rotation, chipping in with 12 wins and a 2.99 E.R.A.  Finally, reliever Phil Regan had a remarkable year, going 14–1 with 21 saves.

The National League race was a 4 team affair between the Dodgers, Giants, Pirates, and Phillies, with all but the Phillies taking their turn in 1st place during the summer. The Dodgers vaulted to the top with an 8-game win streak in mid-September. However, the pennant was still not decided until the final day of the season. The Giants, who had eliminated the Pirates by beating them on the next to last day, needed to beat the Pirates again in the season's final game, and then hope the Dodgers would lose both games of a double header in Philadelphia to the Phillies. If that happened, the Giants would have trailed the Dodgers by 1/2 game, and would still have had to fly to Cincinnati to play the Reds in a make-up game, needing a win to tie for 1st. The Giants defeated the Pirates in extra innings, and the Dodgers lost the first game of the double header, blowing a lead in the 8th inning. However, while the Giants were waiting at the Pittsburgh airport (not knowing if they were going to fly to Cincinnati or go home), Koufax beat the Phillies in the second game of the double header. While they were waiting, a reporter asked Giants pitcher Ron Herbel "you guys don't know where you're going yet, do you?" Herbel replied "we know where we're going. No way superman (Koufax) loses the second game."

Season standings

Record vs. opponents

Opening Day lineup

Notable transactions
 April 26, 1966: signed Jim Gilliam out of retirement.
 May 10, 1966: Johnny Podres was acquired from the Dodgers by the Detroit Tigers.
 May 27, 1966: Howie Reed was traded by the Dodgers to the California Angels for Dick Egan and a player to be named later. The Angels completed the deal by sending John Butler (minors) to the Dodgers on December 7.
 May 28, 1966: Wes Covington was signed as a free agent by the Dodgers.
 July 5, 1966: Signed 1B Dick Stuart as a free agent.
 September 10, 1966: Thad Tillotson and cash were traded by the Dodgers to the New York Yankees for Dick Schofield.

Roster

Player stats

Batting

Starters by position
Note: Pos = Position; G = Games played; AB = At bats; H = Hits; Avg. = Batting average; HR = Home runs; RBI = Runs batted in

Other batters
Note: G = Games played; AB = At bats; H = Hits; Avg. = Batting average; HR = Home runs; RBI = Runs batted in

Pitching

Starting pitchers
Note: G = Games pitched; IP = Innings pitched; W = Wins; L = Losses; ERA = Earned run average; SO = Strikeouts

Other pitchers
Note: G = Games pitched; IP = Innings pitched; W = Wins; L = Losses; ERA = Earned run average; SO = Strikeouts

Relief pitchers
Note: G = Games pitched; W = Wins; L = Losses; SV = Saves; ERA = Earned run average; SO = Strikeouts

1966 World Series

Game 1
October 5, 1966, at Dodger Stadium in Los Angeles. Attendance: 55,941

Game 2
October 6, 1966, at Dodger Stadium in Los Angeles. Attendance: 55,947

Game 3
October 8, 1966, at Memorial Stadium in Baltimore, Maryland. Attendance: 54,445

Game 4 
October 9, 1966, at Memorial Stadium in Baltimore, Maryland. Attendance: 54,458

Awards and honors

Cy Young Award
Sandy Koufax
Gold Glove Award
Johnny Roseboro, catcher
Comeback Player of the Year Award
Phil Regan

All-Stars 
1966 Major League Baseball All-Star Game
Sandy Koufax, starter, pitcher
Jim Lefebvre, starter, second base
Phil Regan, reserve
Maury Wills, reserve

The Sporting News awards 
TSN Rookie Pitcher of the Year Award
Don Sutton
TSN Pitcher of the Year Award
Sandy Koufax
TSN Fireman of the Year Award
Phil Regan
TSN National League All-Star
Sandy Koufax
Hutch Award
Sandy Koufax

Farm system

LEAGUE CHAMPIONS: Tri-City, Ogden

1966 Major League Baseball Draft

This was the second Major League Baseball Draft.  The Dodgers drafted 67 players in the June draft and 9 in the January draft. The top draft pick was pitcher Lawrence Hutton from Greenfield High School in Greenfield, Indiana. He played in the Dodgers farm system through 1971 and finished with a 22–28 record and 4.33 ERA in 117 games, never advancing past AA.

The most successful picks from this draft class were Bill Russell and Charlie Hough. Russell, the ninth round pick out of Pittsburg High School played with the Dodgers through 1986, mostly as a shortstop and later managed the team from 1996–1998. Hough was drafted in the eighth round out of Hialeah High School as an infielder but quickly converted to pitcher. He played with the Dodgers through 1980 and then with three other teams until he retired in 1994. He later became a coach for the Dodgers organization.

Notes

References 
Baseball-Reference season page
Baseball Almanac season page

External links
Los Angeles Dodgers 1966 uniform
Los Angeles Dodgers official web site

Los Angeles Dodgers seasons
Los Angeles Dodgers season
National League champion seasons
Los Angel